Chicoreus denudatus, common name the branch-bearing murex, is a species of sea snail, a marine gastropod mollusk in the family Muricidae, the murex snails or rock snails.

Description
The size of an adult shell varies between 25 mm and 75 mm.

Distribution
This marine species occurs along Queensland and northern Tasmania from the intertidal zone to depths up to 100 m, but most commonly in the subtidal zone.

References

 Poirier, J., 1883. Révision des Murex. Nouvelles Archives du Muséum d'Histoire naturelle 5: 13-128, sér. série 2
 Houart, R., 1992. The genus Chicoreus and related genera (Gastropoda: Muricidae) in the Indo-West Pacific. Mémoires du Muséum national d'Histoire naturelle 154(A): 1–188

External links
 Quoy J.R.C. & Gaimard J.P. (1832–1835). Voyage de découvertes de l'"Astrolabe" exécuté par ordre du Roi, pendant les années 1826–1829, sous le commandement de M. J. Dumont d'Urville. Zoologie. 1: i-l, 1–264; 2(1): 1-321 [1832]; 2(2): 321-686 [1833]; 3(1): 1-366 [1834]; 3(2): 367-954 [1835]; Atlas (Mollusques): pls 1-93 [1833]. Paris: Tastu
 MNHN, Paris: lectotype
 Seashells of New South Wales: Chicoreus denudatus; accessed : 25 June 2011
 

Muricidae
Gastropods described in 1811